Chrysopilus erythrophthalmus is a Palearctic species of  snipe fly in the family Rhagionidae.

References

External links
Images representing Chrysopilus 

Rhagionidae
Insects described in 1840
Taxa named by Hermann Loew
Diptera of Europe